Ernesto Estrada may refer to:

 Ernesto Estrada (basketball) (1949–2015), Filipino basketball player
 Ernesto Estrada (scientist) (born 1966), Cuban scientist